Stalin's Disciples (in Hebrew Stalin's Children) is a 1986 Israeli film directed by Nadav Levitan that satirizes the utopian ideology of the Israeli kibbutz.

Plot
The death of Joseph Stalin in the 1950s leads to an ideological crisis on a kibbutz that identifies with communist principles.  The blind faith of three elderly shoemakers, who previously abused a young boy daring to criticize Stalin, begins to disintegrate when they learn of the Soviet leader's crimes and the manifest antisemitism on display at the Prague Trials.

Cast
 Aharon Almog
 Ezra Dagan
 Rahel Dobson
 Doron Golan
 Yossi Kantz
 David Rona
 Shmuel Shiloh
 Hugo Yarden

Critical reception
The film was screened in the Un Certain Regard section at the 1988 Cannes Film Festival. Although it was both a critical and commercial failure, it was nominated for a Golden Globe Award and was the first Israeli feature to participate in the Moscow and Warsaw Film Festivals.

Yehuda (Judd) Neeman, a film researcher and director, has said that Stalin's Disciples (actually in Hebrew Stalin's Children) was "the first film to look ironically at Stalinism and the kibbutz movement. . . Nadav Levitan took characters from the actual fabric of the kibbutz he knew, including the sandal workshop with Stalin's picture on the wall, and little by little wove the pieces together. Blind worship for Stalin and unshaken belief in the Soviet Union was disintegrating on the kibbutz, partly triggered by 1952 Prague arrest and confession under torture of spying for British intelligence against Communist states by far left Hashomer Hatzair and Mapam functionary Mordechai Oren of Kibbutz Mizra.

At the end of the film there is the charming moment when one of the heroes looks at the sky, doesn't believe that this era has ended, looks at the moon and instead of seeing the crescent, sees the hammer and sickle. In my eyes, this is a brilliant cinematic touch and also a statement of political film, which was at its peak here in those days."

References

External links

1986 films
1980s Hebrew-language films
Films about the kibbutz
Films directed by Nadav Levitan
1986 drama films
Israeli satirical films
Israeli drama films